"Mr. DJ" is a song by Sweden-based musician and producer Dr. Alban, released as a double-single with "Guess Who's Coming to Dinner" in 1997. It was the lead single from his fifth studio album, I Believe (1997), and has been described as a typical Dr. Alban song, but updated to incorporate more progressive house and trance. Featuring backing vocals by singer Monica Löfgren, it was very successful in Spain, peaking at number three on the Spanish singles chart. Additionally, it peaked at number six in Sweden and number eight in Finland, and also charted in Austria and Germany. On the Eurochart Hot 100, the single peaked at number 79. German DJ/production team Sash! made remixes of the track. A music video was also produced to promote the single.

Track listing

Charts

References

 

1997 singles
1997 songs
CNR Music singles
Dr. Alban songs
English-language Swedish songs